Werk 80 is the fifth full-length album by German industrial gothic metal band Atrocity and was released in 1997. It's the band's first full-length album with cover versions of popular 1980s songs. Atrocity released a sequel, Werk 80 II, in 2008.

Track listing

CD

LP

Werk 80 II limited edition
On 29 February 2008 Atrocity released the follow-up Werk 80 II. A limited two disc edition was released on the same day, with on the second disc a re-pressing of the original Werk 80 with additional bonus tracks that had been previously released as tracks on the fourth side of the LP and two extra tracks of singles released from Werk 80: "Tainted Love (Albrin-mix)" and "Shout (Edit)".:

Credits 
Produced by Alexander Krull & Bruno Kramm.
Recorded & Mixed at Dance Macabre Studio, Bayreuth.
Engineered by Bruno Kramm, Eva Istok, Ingo Beitz.
Mixed by Bruno Kramm and Alexander Krull.
Mastered by Alexander Krull at Master Sound.
Keyboards and sampling by Bruno Kramm.
Guest vocals by Liv Kristine Espenaes.
Classical voice by Sofia Solovej.

References

Atrocity (band) albums
1997 albums
Covers albums
Massacre Records albums
Albums produced by Alexander Krull